The following list sets out to show all the railway companies set up by Acts of Parliament in the 19th century before 1860. Most of them became constituent parts of the emerging main-line railway companies, often immediately after being built. Some continued as independent companies until the 1923 Grouping; a few retained that independence until 1947. They have been listed under Scottish; and English and Welsh early railways; and under the later main line company which absorbed them.

Each of the main line companies after the Grouping has an article listing all companies who became part of, and jointly part of, individual companies. Many of those had been in separate existence since being set up in the 19th century, and were only in 1923 losing that individuality.

The list is by no means complete: in 1846 alone there were 272 railways agreed by Act of Parliament, although not all of those were built, since it was the time of the Railway Mania. In addition lines might be extensions to existing ones, but floated as a separate company to separate the risk, and to ring-fence subscriptions, or promoted by a company which was mostly financed by an existing company. An example is the Dore and Chinley Railway which was floated as a company and then adopted and largely financed by the Midland.

Scottish early railways

Caledonian Railway (incorporated 1845)
 Caledonian Railway became part of the London, Midland and Scottish Railway on 1 July 1923 under the Railways Act 1921.
 Aberdeen Railway opened in stages between 1848 and 1853
 Brechin and Edzell District Railway
Cathcart District Railway
 Crieff and Comrie Railway authorised 1890
 Crieff and Methven Junction Railway opened 1867
 Crieff Junction Railway opened 1856
 Dunblane, Doune and Callander Railway incorporated in 1846
 Dundee and Newtyle Railway opened 1841 (incorporated in Scottish Central Railway)
 Glasgow and Paisley Joint Railway opened 12 August 1840.
 Glasgow Central Railway; opened 26 November 1894
 Glasgow, Garnkirk and Coatbridge Railway opened 1831 as the Garnkirk and Glasgow Railway
 Glasgow, Paisley and Greenock Railway opened 29 March 1840; merged with the Caledonian Railway 1847
 Hamilton and Strathaven Railway opened 6 August 1860; taken over by the Caledonian Railway 1864
 Lanarkshire and Dunbartonshire Railway authorised in 1891
 Lochearnhead, St Fillans and Comrie Railway opened Comrie to St Fillans 1 October 1901; opened to Balqhidder 1 May 1905
 Perth, Almond Valley & Methven Railway opened 1858
 Scottish Central Railway (to Perth and Dundee), formed in 1845
 Scottish North Eastern Railway (to Aberdeen)
 Wishaw and Coltness Railway

Independent Lines operated by the Caledonian Railway
 Callander and Oban Railway opened 1 July 1880
 Killin Railway, opened 13 March 1886
 Lanarkshire and Ayrshire Railway opened 1888

Glasgow and South Western Railway (title assumed 1850)
 Glasgow and South Western Railway became part of the London, Midland and Scottish Railway on 1 January 1923 under the Railways Act 1921.
 Ardrossan and Johnstone Railway opened 6 November 1831; became the dual-tracked Ardrossan Railway on 23 July 1840
 Bridge of Weir Railway opened 1864
 Glasgow and Paisley Joint Railway opened 12 August 1840.
 Glasgow, Paisley, Kilmarnock and Ayr Railway opened 12 August 1840
 Glasgow, Barrhead and Kilmarnock Joint Railway opened 29 September 1848
 Greenock and Ayrshire Railway opened 23 December 1869
 Kilmarnock and Troon Railway: First railway in Scotland authorised by Act of Parliament, opened 6 July 1812; originally worked by horses, converted to steam operation in 1817
 Maidens and Dunure Railway opened 17 May 1906
 Paisley and Renfrew Railway opened 21 July 1835; Scotch gauge railway originally locomotive hauled, then down graded to horse operation. Reopened as dual track, standard gauge, line 1 May 1866.

Great North of Scotland Railway (incorporated 1845)
 Great North of Scotland Railway became part of the London and North Eastern Railway on 1 January 1923 under the Railways Act 1921.
 Aberdeen and Turriff Railway
 Alford Valley Railway built 1859
 Banffshire Railway
 Banff, Macduff and Turriff Extension Railway
 Banff, Portsoy and Strathisla Railway
 Deeside Railway
 Deeside Extension Railway
 Formartine and Buchan Railway
 Inverury and Old Meldrum Junction Railway
 Keith and Dufftown Railway
 Morayshire Railway opened 10 August 1852
 Strathspey Railway

Highland Railway (title assumed 1865)
 Highland Railway became part of the London, Midland and Scottish Railway on 1 January 1923 under the Railways Act 1921.
 Dingwall and Skye Railway opened 19 August 1870
 Duke of Sutherland's Railway opened 19 June 1871
 Findhorn Railway opened 18 April 1859
 Inverness and Aberdeen Junction Railway opened 18 August 1858
 Inverness and Nairn Railway (INR) opened 5 November 1855
 Inverness and Perth Junction Railway opened 9 September 1863
 Inverness and Ross-shire Railway opened 23 March 1863
 Nairn and Keith Railway opened 1858 amalgamated with INR 1861
 Perth and Dunkeld Railway opened 7 April 1856
 Sutherland Railway opened 13 April 1868
 Sutherland and Caithness Railway opened 28 July 1874
 Wick and Lybster Railway

North British Railway (incorporated 1844)
 North British Railway became part of the London and North Eastern Railway on 1 January 1923 under the Railways Act 1921.
 Ballochney Railway opened 8 August 1828
 Dundee and Arbroath Railway
 Edinburgh and Dalkeith Railway opened 1831
 Edinburgh and Glasgow Railway opened 28 July 1863
 Edinburgh Suburban and Southside Junction Railway
 Glasgow, Yoker and Clydebank Railway authorised in 1878
 Invergarry and Fort Augustus Railway opened 1901
 Kincardine Line open to Kincardine in 1893, and on to Dunfermline in 1906
 Monkland and Kirkintilloch Railway first public steam railway in Scotland opened 1826
 Newburgh and North Fife Railway
 Slamannan Railway opened 31 August 1840
 Stirling and Dunfermline Railway opened progressively between 1850 and 1853
 West Highland Railway opened 7 August 1894 with an extension to Mallaig opened 1901.

English and Welsh early railways
This list of lines in England and Wales is ordered roughly by region, with the exception
of the GWR which was a very large company even pre-1900.

East
 Great Eastern Railway
 Eastern Counties Railway (ECR) opened 20 June 1839; original 5 ft gauge converted to standard in 1845, absorbed into GER Aug 1862
 Eastern Union Railway, incorporated 1844, opened 1846, absorbed 1847.
 Eastern Union and Hadleigh Junction Railway
 Ipswich and Bury St Edmunds Railway
 Colchester, Stour Valley, Sudbury and Halstead Railway, incorporated 1846, opened 1848
 East Anglia Railway. absorbed into Eastern Counties Railway, Jan 1852
 Saffron Walden Railway incorporated 1861, sponsored by ECR.
 Northern and Eastern Railway incorporated 1836 gauge conversion as with ECR
 London and Blackwall Railway, opened 1840, extended to Tilbury with ECR 1854 (authorised 1852 as London, Tilbury and Southend Railway (LT&SR)), absorbed by GER 1866. Started with non-standard gauge, converted 1849.
 Ely, Haddenham and Sutton Railway (later Ely and St Ives Railway), authorised 1864, opened 1866, leased by ECR since opening, absorbed by GER 1897
 Norfolk Railway
 Colne Valley and Halstead Railway, incorporated 1856
 Harwich Railway
 East Anglian Railways (the plural is correct!) formed by merger in 1847. Bankrupt in 1851, it was operated by arrangement by ECR until the takeover by GER.
 Lynn and Dereham Railway
 Lynn and Ely Railway
 Ely and Huntingdon Railway
 East Suffolk Railway (re-incorporation of the "Halesworth, Beccles and Hadiscoe Railway" in 1854), absorbed by ECR 1859
 Yarmouth and Haddiscoe Railway absorbed 1858
 Lowestoft and Beccles Railway absorbed 1858
Midland and Great Northern Joint Railway incorporated 1893

Great Western Railway
 Great Western Railway incorporated 1835, opened London to Maidenhead Bridge 4 June 1838, completed throughout to Bristol 30 June 1841
 Hayle Railway opened 23 December 1837, closed for rebuilding 16 February 1852, reopened by West Cornwall Railway
 Cheltenham and Great Western Union Railway opened Swindon to Cirencester 31 May 1841, opened throughout to Cheltenham 13 October 1847
 Bristol and Exeter Railway opened to Bridgwater 14 June 1841, completed in stages to Exeter 1 May 1844, amalgamated with GWR 1 January 1876
 Cornwall Minerals Railway opened 1 June 1874 replacing and connecting several earlier railways and tramways. Amalgamated with GWR 1 July 1896
 Par Tramway, construction started c.1841, completed north of Pontsmill 1847, extended to Par Harbour 1855
 Newquay Railway authorised by Act of Parliament 1844, completed 1849
 Lostwithiel and Fowey Railway opened 1 June 1869, closed 1 January 1880, transferred to CMR 27 June 1893 and reopened 1893
 Newquay and Cornwall Junction Railway opened 1 July 1869, transferred to CMR 1 June 1874
 Liskeard and Caradon Railway opened 28 November 1844, vested in GWR 1 July 1909
 Shrewsbury and Chester Railway opened 4 November 1846, amalgamated with GWR 1 September 1854
 South Devon Railway opened 30 May 1846, completed in stages to Plymouth 2 April 1849, amalgamated with GWR 1 February 1876
 Torquay branch opened 18 December 1848
 South Devon and Tavistock Railway opened 22 June 1859
 Dartmouth and Torbay Railway completed 16 August 1864
 Launceston and South Devon Railway opened 22 June 1865
 Moretonhampstead and South Devon Railway opened 4 July 1866
 Buckfastleigh, Totnes and South Devon Railway opened 1 May 1872
 Berks and Hants Railway opened Reading to Hungerford 21 December 1847 and Reading to Basingstoke 1 November 1848; Berks and Hants Extension Hungerford to Devizes opened 11 November 1862
 Wilts, Somerset and Weymouth Railway, opened Chippenham to Westbury 5 September 1848; completed in stages to Weymouth 20 January 1857
 Shrewsbury and Birmingham Railway opened 1 June 1849, amalgamated with GWR 1 September 1854
 South Wales Railway opened Chepstow to Landore 18 June 1850, Chepstow Bridge opened 19 June 1862, amalgamated with GWR 1 January 1862
 Gloucester and Dean Forest Railway opened 19 September 1851
 Vale of Neath Railway opened 24 September 1851, amalgamated into GWR 1 February 1865
 West Cornwall Railway opened 11 March 1852 including previous Hayle Railway, transferred to GWR 1 January 1868
 Hereford, Ross and Gloucester Railway opened 11 July 1853
 Wycombe Railway opened 1 August 1854
 Abingdon Railway opened 2 June 1856
 Bridport Railway opened 12 November 1857, bought by GWR 1 July 1901, closed 5 May 1975
 Liskeard and Looe Railway, railway opened 11 May 1858, vested in GWR 1 January 1923
 East Somerset Railway first stage opened 9 November 1858, completed 1 March 1862
 Great Western and Brentford Railway opened 18 July 1858
 Cornwall Railway opened to Truro 4 May 1859, extended to Falmouth 21 August 1863, amalgamated with GWR 1 July 1889
 West Midland Railway formed 1 July 1860, amalgamated with GWR 1 August 1863
 Oxford, Worcester and Wolverhampton Railway opened at Worcester 5 October 1850, completed from Wolverhampton to Oxford in stages by April 1854
 Newport, Abergavenny and Hereford Railway opened 2 January 1851
 Worcester and Hereford Railway opened 25 July 1859
 Severn Valley Railway opened 1 February 1862
 Ely Valley Railway opened 1 August 1860

Midlands
 Manchester, Sheffield and Lincolnshire Railway (became Great Central Railway 1897)
 Great Central Railway incorporated 1897
 Manchester, Sheffield and Lincolnshire Railway: formed by an amalgamation of:
 Sheffield, Ashton-under-Lyne and Manchester Railway
 Sheffield and Lincolnshire Junction Railway
 Great Grimsby and Sheffield Junction Railway
 including Grimsby Docks Company.
 South Yorkshire Railway opened 9 September 1854, merged with GCR 1 August 1864
Including southern part of Sheffield, Rotherham, Barnsley, Wakefield, Huddersfield and Goole Railway Company
 Wigan Junction Railway
 Wrexham, Mold and Connah's Quay Railway
 North Wales and Liverpool Railway
 Liverpool, St Helens and South Lancashire Railway
 Lancashire, Derbyshire and East Coast Railway acquired in 1907
 Midland Railway: formed 1844 by amalgamation:
 North Midland Railway
 Midland Counties Railway
 Birmingham and Derby Junction Railway
Later acquired:
 Leicester and Swannington Railway opened 14 July 1832
 Sheffield and Rotherham Railway 1838
 Birmingham and Gloucester Railway opened 17 December 1840
 "Little" North Western Railway (Skipton – Lancaster) opened 1 June 1850
 Manchester, Buxton, Matlock and Midlands Junction Railway
 North Staffordshire Railway incorporated in 1845 to promote three railway schemes. Three Acts of Parliament on 26 June 1846 were given to the one company. Main line opened in 1848. Further Acts were all granted to the NSR Co. which remained independent until the 1923 Grouping.

North
 Maryport and Carlisle Railway (first section) opened 1845. Remained independent until the 1923 Grouping
 Furness Railway (Furness) (first section) opened 11 August 1846
 Ulverston and Lancaster Railway opened 1857 amalgamated with Furness in 1862
Great Northern Railway incorporated 1846
 Edgware, Highgate and London Railway incorporated 1862
 London and York Railway
 Direct Northern Railway
 North Eastern Railway (NER) incorporated 1854
York, Newcastle and Berwick Railway was York and Newcastle Railway (1846–1847) and Newcastle and Darlington Junction Railway (1842–1846)
Durham Junction Railway incorporated 1834, amalgamated with N&DJR in 1844
Brandling Junction Railway incorporated 1836, amalgamated with N&DJR in 1845
Durham and Sunderland Railway incorporated 1834, amalgamated with N&DJR in 1846
Pontop and South Shields Railway incorporated 1842, amalgamated with N&DJR in 1846
Stanhope and Tyne Railway incorporated 1834, amalgamated with P&SSR in 1842
Newcastle and Berwick Railway incorporated 1845, amalgamated with Y&NR in 1847
Newcastle and North Shields Railway incorporated 1836, amalgamated with N&BR in 1845
Great North of England Railway incorporated 1836, amalgamated with YN&BR in 1850
York and North Midland Railway incorporated 1836
Leeds and Selby Railway incorporated 1830, amalgamated with Y&NMR in 1844
Whitby and Pickering Railway incorporated 1833, amalgamated with Y&NMR in 1845
East and West Yorkshire Junction Railway incorporated 1846, amalgamated with Y&NMR in 1852
Leeds Northern Railway was Leeds and Thirsk Railway (1845–1849)
Malton and Driffield Railway incorporated 1846
Deerness Valley Railway incorporated 1855, amalgamated with NER in 1857
Hartlepool Dock and Railway incorporated 1832, amalgamated with NER in 1857
North Yorkshire and Cleveland Railway incorporated 1854, amalgamated with NER in 1858
Bedale and Leyburn Railway incorporated 1853, amalgamated with NER in 1859
Hull and Holderness Railway incorporated 1853, amalgamated with NER in 1862
Newcastle and Carlisle Railway incorporated 1829, amalgamated with NER in 1862
Blaydon, Gateshead and Hebburn Railway incorporated 1834, amalgamated with N&CR in 1839
Stockton and Darlington Railway incorporated 1821, amalgamated with NER in 1863
Darlington and Barnard Castle Railway incorporated 1854, amalgamated with S&DR in 1858
Middlesbrough and Guisborough Railway incorporated 1852, amalgamated with S&DR in 1858
Middlesbrough and Redcar Railway incorporated 1845, amalgamated with S&DR in 1858
Wear Valley Railway incorporated 1845, amalgamated with S&DR in 1858
Bishop Auckland and Weardale Railway incorporated 1837, amalgamated with WVR in 1847
Eden Valley Railway incorporated 1858, amalgamated with S&DR in 1862
Frosterley and Stanhope Railway incorporated 1861, amalgamated with S&DR in 1862
South Durham and Lancashire Union Railway incorporated 1857, amalgamated with S&DR in 1862
Cleveland Railway incorporated 1858, amalgamated with NER in 1865
West Hartlepool Harbour and Railway incorporated 1852, amalgamated with NER in 1865
Clarence Railway incorporated 1828, amalgamated with WHH&R in 1853
Stockton and Hartlepool Railway incorporated 1839, amalgamated with WHH&R in 1853
Hull and Hornsea Railway incorporated 1862, amalgamated with NER in 1866
West Durham Railway incorporated 1839, amalgamated with NER in 1870
Hull and Selby Railway incorporated 1836, amalgamated with NER in 1872
Blyth and Tyne Railway incorporated 1852, amalgamated with NER in 1874
Hexham and Allendale Railway incorporated 1865, amalgamated with NER in 1876
Leeds, Castleford and Pontefract Junction Railway incorporated 1873, amalgamated with NER in 1876
Tees Valley Railway incorporated 1865, amalgamated with NER in 1882
Hylton, Southwick and Monkwearmouth Railway incorporated 1871, amalgamated with NER in 1883
Scotswood, Newburn and Wylam Railway incorporated 1871, amalgamated with NER in 1883
Whitby, Redcar and Middlesbrough Union Railway incorporated 1866, amalgamated with NER in 1889
Wear Valley Extension Railway incorporated 1892, amalgamated with NER in 1893
Scarborough & Whitby Railway incorporated 1871, amalgamated with NER in 1898
Cawood, Wistow and Selby Light Railway incorporated 1896, amalgamated with NER in 1900
Scarborough, Bridlington and West Riding Junction Railway incorporated 1885, amalgamated with NER in 1914
 Lancashire and Yorkshire Railway incorporated 1847. In 1846 the Liverpool and Bury Railway was amalgamated with the Manchester and Leeds Railway, which became known as The Lancashire and Yorkshire Railway in 1847
 Manchester and Leeds Railway incorporated 1836
 Manchester and Bolton Railway opened 1838
 Ashton, Stalybridge and Liverpool Junction Railway 1844
 Liverpool and Bury Railway 1845
 East Lancashire Railway opened 1846: a section of this line is now a heritage railway
 Wakefield, Pontefract and Goole Railway opened 1848
 Liverpool, Crosby and Southport Railway opened 1848
 London and North Western Railway (LNWR) formed by amalgamation in 1846, there were 45 formerly independent railways within the LNWR, including:
 Liverpool and Manchester Railway opened 15 September 1830
 London and Birmingham Railway (first section) opened 20 July 1837; opened throughout 17 September 1838
 Grand Junction Railway opened 1837
 Chester and Crewe Railway opened 1846
 Chester and Holyhead Railway opened 1848 to Bangor 1850 to Holyhead
 Manchester and Birmingham Railway
 Lancaster and Carlisle Railway
 Cromford and High Peak Railway
 Kendal and Windermere Railway
 Watford and Rickmansworth Railway opened 1 October 1862 closed 1998 possible reopening (see Watford tube station)

South
 Isle of Wight Central Railway incorporated 1887, amalgamation of several smaller railways including:
 Cowes and Newport Railway incorporated 1859
 Ryde & Newport Railway opened 1875
 Isle of Wight (Newport Junction) Railway completed 1879
 London Brighton and South Coast Railway amalgamation of five railways August 1846:
 London and Croydon Railway incorporated 1835 opened 1839
 London and Brighton Railway incorporated 1837 opened 21 September 1841
 Croydon and Epsom Railway incorporated 1844.
 Brighton and Chichester Railway incorporated 1844.
 Brighton Lewes and Hastings Railway incorporated 1844.
 West End of London and Crystal Palace Railway opened 1856–8.
 Victoria Station and Pimlico Railway incorporated 1858.
 London, Chatham and Dover Railway
 East Kent Railway incorporated 1853
 Victoria Station and Pimlico Railway incorporated 1858.
 Mid-Kent Railway incorporated 1855.
 London and South Western Railway (LSWR)
 London and Southampton Railway opened (first section) 21 May 1838; renamed LSWR 1838
 Bodmin and Wadebridge Railway opened 23 May 1832, sold to LSWR autumn 1846 but not legally vested in that company until 1 July 1886
 Richmond Railway opened 27 July 1846
 Windsor, Staines and South Western Railway opened 1848–1849
 Southampton and Dorchester Railway opened 1 June 1847; extended to Weymouth 20 June 1857
 Staines, Wokingham and Woking Junction Railway opened 1856
 Andover and Redbridge Railway opened 6 March 1865, closed 1967
 Lymington Railway opened 12 July 1858, closed 1967
 London, Tilbury and Southend Railway incorporated 1862 amalgamated with Midland Railway 1912
 London and Blackwall Railway
 Metropolitan Railway (MetR)
 North Metropolitan Railway incorporated 1853; became MetrR 1854. Other sections followed in 1860–70
 Midland and South Western Junction Railway: formed in 1884 by amalgamation of
 Swindon, Marlborough and Andover Railway incorporated 1873
 Swindon and Cheltenham Extension Railway incorporated 1881
 North London Railway incorporated 1846 original name:
 East and West India Docks and Birmingham Junction Railway
 Pentewan Railway The railway from St Austell was complete by 22 June 1829 but not incorporated until 20 February 1873 as the Pentewan Railway and Harbour Company Limited. An Act of Parliament on 7 August 1874 authorised the use of locomotives. It was closed from 4 March 1918.
 Redruth and Chasewater Railway This was opened on 30 January 1826 and was locomotive worked from 1 December 1864. It was closed from 27 September 1915.
 Somerset and Dorset Joint Railway (S&DJR). An amalgamation of the:
 Somerset Central Railway, first section opened on 1 November 1860, and
 Dorset Central Railway, first section opened on 28 August 1854.
 The S&D Joint Railway was jointly operated by the Midland Railway and the London and South Western Railway (L&SWR).  After the 1 January 1923 Grouping, joint ownership of the S&DJR passed to the LMS and the Southern Railway.
 South Eastern Railway incorporated 1836
 London and Greenwich Railway
 Canterbury and Whitstable Railway
 Mid-Kent Railway incorporated 1855.
 Reading, Guildford and Reigate Railway
 Surrey Iron Railway(SIR) opened 1804 (4 ft gauge):
 Croydon Merstham and Godstone Railway – extension of SIR
 West Somerset Mineral Railway incorporated 1855 to carry iron ore; passenger service from 1865; closed to all traffic 1898 see article here

Wales
 Cambrian Railways incorporated between 1864 and 1904
 Oswestry and Newtown Railway 30 miles: incorporated 6 June 1855; opened 1860-1
 Llanidloes and Newtown Railway  miles: 4 August 1853; 1859. Until 1861 this section of the line was completely isolated
 Newtown and Machynlleth Railway 23 miles: 27 July 1857; 1863
 Oswestry, Ellesmere and Whitchurch Railway 18 miles: 1 August 1861; 1863-4
 Aberystwith and Welsh Coast Railway 86 miles: 26 July 1861; 1863–69
 Mid Wales Railway  miles: 1 August 1859; 1 September 1864. This Railway maintained complete independence from the Cambrian until 1 January 1888, when the latter took over working the line; and on 1 July 1904 when the two Railways amalgamated.
 and several railways opened in the 1860s
 Festiniog Railway incorporated 23 May 1832 ( gauge)  miles opened 1836 to carry dressed slate from Blaenau Ffestiniog to Porthmadog for export by sea, carried passengers from 1865. Still independent and since 1954 a leading heritage railway.
 Llanelly Railway and Dock Company incorporated 1828
 Rhymney Railway incorporated 1854
 Taff Vale Railway (TVR) incorporated 1836. Among the eight railways amalgamated with the TVR is one early railway:
 Aberdare Railway opened 1846

See also
 History of rail transport in Great Britain
 History of rail transport in Great Britain to 1830
 History of rail transport in Great Britain 1830–1922

References

Notes

Sources
 
 
 

Early British railway companies
Pre-grouping British railway companies
Early British railway companies